The Metropolitan Learning Center (MLC) is a magnet school that is based in Bloomfield, Connecticut. The school is part of the Capitol Region Education Council.

History
The school was founded in 1996. Educators from CREC and the original participating communities of Bloomfield, East Windsor, Hartford, Windsor and Windsor Locks planned this global studies school. In 1997, the Connecticut State Legislature approved the appropriation of $32 million for the construction of a grades 6–12 Metropolitan Learning Center, a School for Global and International Studies, which opened in September 1998 in the old Bloomfield Junior High School Building. Enfield later joined the program in 2000. In the fall of 2001, with grades 6–9, the school was moved to its new building at 1551 Blue Hills Avenue Bloomfield. It now serves nearly 700 students in grades 6–12 from Bloomfield, Hartford, Enfield, Windsor, East Windsor, and Windsor Locks. Public Act 07-3 allowed students in non-participating districts to apply for a seat in an inter-district magnet school if seats are available. With this legislative change, students in any town are allowed to apply to MLC and may be granted a seat.
The school is also known for the infamous marijuana incident. Upper-class men brought in "weed" brownies also known as edibles, this led to the hospitalization of one student.

Facility
The MLC building was completed in the fall of 2001, after two years of construction.

Designed to feel like a corporate workplace, the main building is made up of two stories, each containing four grade-area pods. The library (MediaCenter) is centered on the first floor among the four pods, along with the main and guidance offices.

The art, television studio, and tech rooms are centered among the pods on the second floor. The secondary building is home to the cafeteria, gymnasium, exercise room, auditorium (Conference Area), and the music department.

All rooms have wireless internet connections to work with the students' laptops, and all classrooms have Smartboards that work with the teachers' desktop computers.

Sports 
The school had begun offering a small number of athletic programs in the year 2013 and has since expanded its offerings, now providing a variety of both middle and high school sports, coordinated by the Capital Region Education Council's Interscholastic Athletic Program.

As per 2016 the school offers:
 High School Varsity Boys Soccer
 High School Girls Soccer
 High School Varsity Girls Volleyball
 High School JV Girls Volleyball
 High School Boys Cross Country
 High School Girls Cross Country
 Middle School Boys Soccer
 Middle School Girls Soccer
 Middle School Girls Volleyball
 Middle School Boys Cross Country
 Middle School Girls Cross Country
 Middle School Boys Basketball
 Middle School Girls Basketball
 High School Varsity Boys Basketball
 High School Varsity Girls Basketball
 High School JV Boys Basketball
 High School JV Girls Basketball
 High School Boys Indoor Track
 High School Girls Indoor Track
 Middle School Boys Basketball
 Middle School Girls Basketball
 Middle School Boys Indoor Track
 Middle School Girls Indoor Track
 Football (Freshman, JV, Varsity)*
* Joint Program between Metropolitan Learning Center, Two-Rivers Magnet High School, & Academy of Aerospace & Engineering

References

External links
 

Bloomfield, Connecticut
Magnet schools in Connecticut
Public high schools in Connecticut
Public middle schools in Connecticut